George Vasilyevich Malakov (Ukrainian: Георгій Васильович Малаков, Russian: Георгий Васильевич Малаков) (1928–1979) was a Ukrainian artist from Kiev, Ukraine (then the Ukrainian SSR). He specialized in engraving.

References

External links
  Article on Malakov
Venus through Georgii Malakov's eyes. Special Project of the Library of Ukrainian Art.

1928 births
1979 deaths
Soviet artists
20th-century engravers